The Combined Charging System (CCS) is a standard for charging electric vehicles. These two connectors are extensions of the IEC 62196 Type 1 and Type 2 connectors, with two additional direct current (DC) contacts to allow high-power DC fast charging.

The Combined Charging System allows AC charging using the Type 1 and Type 2 connector depending on the geographical region. This charging environment encompasses charging couplers, charging communication, charging stations, the electric vehicle and various functions for the charging process such as load balancing and charge authorization.

Electric vehicles or electric vehicle supply equipment (EVSE) are CCS-capable if they support either AC or DC charging according to the standards listed by the CCS. Automobile manufacturers that support CCS include BMW, Daimler, FCA, Ford, Jaguar, General Motors, Groupe PSA, Honda, Hyundai, Kia, Mazda, MG, Polestar, Renault, Rivian, Tesla, Mahindra, Tata Motors and Volkswagen Group.

Competing charging systems for high-power DC charging include CHAdeMO (Japanese), Guobiao recommended-standard 20234 (Chinese), and Tesla Supercharger (Tesla).

History 
The revival of interest in electric cars spurred deployment of charging stations.  Initially, these accessed the abundant AC mains electricity using a variety of plugs around the world. The standardization in IEC 62196 for higher-current charging connectors brought about various systems: Type 1 was used primarily in North America and Japan, and Type 2 variants elsewhere. For DC charging, the SAE and European Automobile Manufacturers Association (ACEA) made a plan to add common DC wires to the existing AC connector types such that there would be only one "global envelope" that fitted all DC charging stations.

The proposal for a "Combined Charging System" (CCS) was published at the 15th International VDI-Congress (Association of German Engineers) on 12 October 2011 in Baden-Baden. CCS defines a single connector pattern on the vehicle side that offers enough space for a Type 1 or Type 2 connector, along with space for a two-pin DC connector allowing charging at up to 200amps. Seven car makers (Audi, BMW, Daimler, Ford, General Motors, Porsche and Volkswagen) agreed in late 2011 to introduce CCS in mid-2012. In May 2012, ACEA endorsed the standardization of the Combo 2 connector across the European Union. ACEA were joined later that month by the European Association of Automotive Suppliers (CLEPA) and The Union of the Electricity Industry (EURELECTRIC). Also that month, prototype implementations for up to 100 kW were shown at EVS26 in Los Angeles. DC charging specifications in the IEC 62196-3 draft give a range up to 125 A at up to 850 V.

The seven auto makers also agreed to use HomePlug GreenPHY as the communication protocol. The prototype for the matching plug was developed by Phoenix Contact with the goal to withstand 10,000 connect cycles. The standardization proposal was sent to the IEC in January 2011. The request to use a PLC protocol for the Vehicle2Grid communication was made in September 2009 in a joint presentation of BMW, Daimler and VW at a California Air Resources Board ZEV Technology Symposium. This competed with the CAN bus proposal from Japan (including CHAdeMO) and China (GB/T 20234.3, a separate DC connector standard), and none of their car manufacturers has signed up to CCS. However, China had been involved in early stages of the development of the extra DC pins.

Volkswagen built the first public CCS quick-charge station providing 50 kW DC in Wolfsburg in June 2013 to test drive the VW E-Up that was to be delivered with a DC rapid charger connector for CCS. Two weeks later, BMW opened its first CCS rapid charge station to support the BMW i3. Since at least the second EV World Summit in June 2013, the CHAdeMO association, Volkswagen and Nissan all advocate multi-standard DC chargers, as the additional cost of a dual-protocol station is only 5%.

In Germany, the Charging Interface Initiative e. V. (CharIN) was founded by car makers and suppliers (Audi, BMW, Daimler, Mennekes, Opel, Phoenix Contact, Porsche, TÜV SÜD and Volkswagen) to promote the adoption of CCS. They noted in a press release that most cars cannot charge faster than 50 kW, so that was the first common power output of CCS stations to be built during 2015. The next step was the standardization of stations with 150 kW output that they showed in October 2015, looking to a future system with 350 kW output. Volvo joined CharIN in 2016; Tesla in March 2016; Lucid Motors (previously Atieva) June 2016; Faraday Future June 2016; Toyota in March 2017.

In the United States, BMW and VW claimed in April 2016 that the East Coast and West Coast corridors had "complete" CCS networks. As part of the 2016 settlement of the Volkswagen emissions scandal, VW committed to spend US$2 billion in the United States over the following 10 years on CCS and other charging infrastructure through subsidiary company Electrify America. In this effort, charging stations would be built with up to 150 kW at community-based locations and with up to 350 kW at highway locations. Besides CCS, CHAdeMO charging stations were to be constructed.

In November 2016, Ford, Mercedes, Audi, Porsche and BMW announced they would build a 350 kW (up to 500 A and 920 V) charge network (IONITY) with 400 stations in Europe, at a cost of €200,000 ($220,000) each.

Technical design

Versions of the specifications 
The Combined Charging System is meant to develop with the needs of the customer. Version 1.0 covered the currently common features of AC and DC charging, and version 2.0 addressed the near to midterm future. The specifications and underlying standards for CCS 1.0 and CCS 2.0 are described for DC charging in Table 1 and for AC charging in Table 2.

The automotive manufacturers supporting CCS committed themselves to migrate to CCS 2.0 in 2018. Thus it is recommended for charging station manufacturers to also support CCS 2.0 from 2018 onwards.

The specifications of CCS 3.0 were not yet precisely defined. All features of previous versions shall be preserved to ensure backward compatibility. Potential additional features include:

 Reverse power transfer
 Inductive charging
 Wireless charging communication
 Bus charging with "pantograph" current collector

Charging communication 
Unlike the connector and inlet, which depend on the geographical location, the charging communication is the same around the globe. Generally two types of communication can be differentiated.

 Basic signaling (BS) is done using a pulse-width modulation (PWM) signal which is transferred over the control pilot (CP) contact according to IEC 61851-1. This communication is used for safety-related functions, indicating for example if the connector is plugged in, before contacts are made live (or energized) and if both charging station and electric vehicle are ready for charging. AC charging is possible using the PWM signal only. In this case the charging station uses the duty cycle of the PWM to inform the onboard charger of the maximum available current at the charging station (A pulse width of 5% indicates that HLC shall be used).
 High-level communication (HLC) is done by modulating a high-frequency signal over the CP contact (also known as Power Line Communication or PLC) to transfer more complex information, which may be used e.g. for DC charging or for other services such as "plug and charge" or load balancing. High-level communication is based on the standard DIN SPEC 70121 and the  ISO/IEC 15118-series.

Load balancing 
CCS differentiates between two methods of load balancing.

 Reactive load balancing allows changing the energy flow from Electric Vehicle Supply Equipment (EVSE) to EV instantaneously to a specific limit.
 Scheduled load balancing supports reactive load balancing and additionally a planning of the energy flow from EVSE to EV with e.g. different power limits and cost indicators over time. It may for example be used to optimize energy distribution in a smart grid.

Charging authorization modes 
For charge authorization, generally two approaches are foreseen.

 With "plug and charge", the user plugs in their vehicle and an automated authentication and authorization process is started without any further user interaction. Payment is performed automatically.
 With "external payment", the user has to identify with an RFID card at the terminal, or conduct a payment with a payment card, before they can proceed with charging.

Vehicle coupler 

The vehicle coupler is composed of the vehicle connector, which is mounted at the end of a flexible cable, and the vehicle inlet, the counterpart of the connector, which is located within the vehicle. The CCS couplers were based on the Type 1 coupler, the North American standard, and Type 2 coupler, the European standard, as described in IEC 62196-2. One of the challenges of the Combined Charging System was to develop a vehicle inlet which is compatible with both the existing AC vehicle connectors and additional DC contacts. For both Type 1 and Type 2 this has been accomplished by extending the inlet with two additional DC contacts below the existing AC and communication contacts. The resulting new configurations are commonly known as Combo 1 and Combo 2.

For the DC vehicle connector, the implementation varies slightly between Combo 1 and Combo 2. In the case of Combo 1 the connector is extended by two DC contacts, while the Type 1 portion of the connector remains the same with the AC contacts (L1 & N) being unused. For Combo 2 the AC contacts (L1, L2, L3 & N) are completely removed from the connector and therefore the Type 2 portion of the connector has only three contacts remaining – two communication contacts and a protective earth. The vehicle inlet may retain AC contacts to allow non-CCS AC charging.

In both cases, communication and protective earth functions are covered by the original Type 1 or 2 portion of the connector. The Type 1 and Type 2 connectors are described in IEC 62196-2, while the Combo 1 and Combo 2 connectors are described in IEC 62196-3 as Configurations EE and FF.

High-power charging 

As vehicle couplers for DC charging according to IEC 62196-3:2014 Ed.1 allow DC charging only with currents up to 200 A, they do not sufficiently cover the needs of the future charging infrastructure. Consequently, a later edition of the standard supports currents of up to 500 A. Such high currents, however, either require large cable cross-sections, leading to heavy and stiff cables, or require cooling if thinner cables are desired. In addition, contact resistance leads to more heat dissipation. To cope with these technical issues, the standard IEC TS 62196-3-1 describes the requirements for high-power DC couplers including thermal sensing, cooling and silver-plating of contacts. CharIN are investigating versions over 2 MW for electric trucks, and equipment is being tested.

Competition for global acceptance 
The Combined Charging System is primarily driven by European and North American car manufacturers. Type 1 and Combo 1 chargers are primarily found in North and Central America, Korea and Taiwan, while Type 2 and Combo 2 can be found in Europe, South America, South Africa, Arabia, India, Singapore, Taiwan, Hong Kong, Oceania and Australia. For DC charging the competing standard GB/T 20234-2015 is used in China, while Japan uses CHAdeMO. 

In the European Union, according to Directive 2014/94/EU all high-power DC charging points installed after November 18, 2017 were to be equipped for interoperability purposes at least with Combo 2 connectors. However, this does not prohibit the provision of other charging points using e.g. CHAdeMO or AC Rapid. 

The majority of EVs sold in the United States are made by Tesla and therefore do not natively support CCS charging, but instead used the proprietary Tesla connector from the early-2010s through 2022, though newer Tesla cars also support CCS with a separately sold adapter. In many remaining countries no standard is preferred yet, although CharIN recommended advanced Type 2 and Combo 2 in 2018. In November 2022, Tesla renamed its previously proprietary charging connector to the North American Charging Standard (NACS), making the specifications available to other EV manufacturers as an alternative to the CCS standard that is used by most competitors in North America.

References

External links 
 Charging Interface Initiative (CharIN)

DC power connectors
Plug-in hybrid vehicle industry
Automotive standards
Charging stations
2011 introductions